Bennington Battle Day is a state holiday unique to Vermont, commemorating the victory of American and Vermont forces over British forces at the Battle of Bennington during the American Revolutionary War in 1777. The holiday's date is fixed, occurring on August 16 every year. 

In Bennington, there is a battle re-enactment put on by the local history foundation.

The Battle of Bennington took place in New York, but is so named because the British were headed for a cache of weapons and munitions stored where the Bennington Battle Monument now stands in present-day Old Bennington, Vermont.

References

External links
 Bennington's Official Website
 The Battle of Bennington: An American Victory, a National Park Service Teaching with Historic Places (TwHP) lesson plan
 Official Battlefield page
 The Riflemen's Song at Bennington

Holidays related to the American Revolution
Bennington, Vermont
Vermont culture
August observances